This is a list of years in Cape Verde.

20th century

21st century

See also
 History of Cape Verde

 
Cape Verdean history timelines
Cape Verde